First Dates is a British reality television programme that has aired on Channel 4 since 20 June 2013. The programme has been narrated by Brian Protheroe since 2015.

Production
The programme was filmed at the Paternoster Chop House restaurant in Paternoster Square, central London from 2013 to 2020, showing many people on dates, all of whom have not met each other before. At the end of the date, the couples are interviewed together and asked whether they would like to see each other again. The restaurant is closed to the public while filming takes place. The restaurant is fitted with 42 "Pan–tilt–zoom" cameras and there are at least 70 crew members on set during filming, which lasts 15 hours a day. Each diner is given £25 towards the cost of their meal.

The spin-off show, First Dates Hotel, follows the same TV format with contestants meeting for the first time in a hotel restaurant, but if the date goes well, the couples are offered the opportunity to check in for the night. The first series was filmed at Le Vieux Castillon in Castillon-du-Gard[2] offering idyllic settings with a variety of activities for the successful second daters, and added sommelier Xavier Chapelou to Fred Sirieix's team. The second series was filmed at Aquapetra Resort & Spa in Campania near Naples, Italy.

In 2020 it was announced that filming would move to Manchester for Series 16. The specific location was later confirmed in January 2021, when it was announced that the sixteenth series would begin airing on 19 January 2021, in the new location of The Refinery, located in Spinningfields, in Manchester.

Another spin-off show, Teen First Dates began airing on E4 on 22 February 2021 and consisted of 6 episodes. Each episode was also available to stream on All 4. Following the same format as the parent show and also taking place at Spinningfields, it follows 16-19 year olds as they begin dating for the first time. Season 2 began airing on 23 February 2022 and consisted of 10 episodes.

Restaurant staff
Since series 3 (2015) the restaurant's maître d'hôtel Fred Sirieix offers pieces to camera on the nature of love, romance and dating. When not filming for First Dates, he was the general manager at restaurant Galvin at Windows, although he left in December 2019 after 14 years.

The waiting staff and barman do not work in the restaurant full-time, but are recruited for when the series is being filmed.
CiCi Coleman is an actor who trained at New York Film Academy, whilst barman Merlin Griffiths is a pub landlord who has previously worked as a global brand ambassador for Bombay Sapphire gin. Griffiths also works alongside co-bartender Fiona Beck who as well as working in the First Dates restaurant, has a career in advertising, and has also worked as a model in the past and has featured in fashion shows in Paris, Barcelona and New York. The waiting staff are joined by Grant Urquhart, David Marc and Daniella Kalita.

Transmissions

Regular

Specials

Celebrity First Dates

Teen First Dates

First Dates Hotel

Celebrity First Dates Hotel

Best Bits

International versions
The format created in the United Kingdom has been adapted in Belgium, Finland, Netherlands, Canada, Germany, Australia, Spain, Ireland, New Zealand, Italy, Poland, USA, France, Brazil, Israel, Sweden, Norway, Argentina, Portugal, Austria, South Africa and Greece.

References

External links

2013 British television series debuts
2010s British reality television series
2020s British reality television series
British dating and relationship reality television series
Channel 4 reality television shows
English-language television shows
Television series by Warner Bros. Television Studios
Warner Bros. Television Studios franchises
Television shows set in London